The inverted-T field-effect transistor (ITFET) is a type of field effect transistor invented by Leo Mathew at Freescale Semiconductor.  Part of the device extends vertically from the horizontal plane in an inverted T shape, hence the name.

References 

 Freescale upends thinking on transistor channels (EE Times, December 5, 2005)

Transistor types
Field-effect transistors